The Battle of the Stuhna River (sometimes written as Stugna River; 26 May 1093) was fought between the princes of Kievan Rus', Sviatopolk II of Kiev, Vladimir II Monomakh of Chernigov, and Rostislav Vsevolodovich of Pereyaslavl against the nomadic Cumans. The Kievan forces were defeated.

Background
The Cumans raided Rus' soon after the death of Vsevolod and sought to buy peace with the new great prince, Sviatopolk. However Sviatopolk incarcerated the Cumans' ambassadors, and the Cumans came in force to attack Kiev. Facing an enemy army of eight thousand, Sviatopolk took the advice of counsel and called for help from Vladimir Monomakh, prince of Chernigov. Vladimir came with his troops and also called upon his only brother, Rostislav of Pereyaslav.

Battle
A union of Kievan princes against Cumans was achieved, and Sviatopolk released the ambassadors of Cumans. The troops of the three princes joined together and set out for the city of Trepol'. Approaching the Stuhna River, the princes were undecided, so they stopped to have a council, while the Cumans were across the river facing them. Vladimir, whose wife was a Cuman princess, continued to demand that they sue for peace, but the Kievan troops wanted battle. They crossed the river and met the Cumans in a valley at the rampart of Trepol'. Sviatopolk deployed on the right, Rostislav in the center, and Vladimir on the left. 

As the Kievan troops reached the rampart, the Cumans bowmen attacked Sviatopolk's men, and after a bloody engagement his troops broke. Sviatapolk attempted to make a stand, but the impact of his retreating men carried him back. Then Vladimir's force was attacked and after a fierce confrontation all the Kievan troops were retreating. Sviatapolk took cover in Trepol', but Rostislav and Vladimir attempted to swim the Stuhna River. Rostislav, in heavy chain armour, drowned. Vladimir retreated to Chernigov and Sviatapolk retreated at night to Kiev.

The Kievan-Pechersky Paterick ascribed Rostislav's death to his own haughtiness. It is said that he refused to enter the church and pray for the battle's outcome. The young prince's death is also recalled in the Tale of Igor's Campaign:

Not like that is the river Stuhna - endowed with a meager stream, having fed therefore on other rills and runners, she rent between bushes a youth, prince Rostislav, imprisoning him. On the Dnieper's dark bank Rostislav's mother weeps the youth. Pined away have the flowers with condolement, and the tree has been bent to the ground with sorrow.

See also
Cumania
Battle of Kalka River
Koten

Notes

References
Basil Dmytryshyn, Medieval Russia: A sourcebook 850-1700, Academic International Press, 2000.

External links
Svyatopolk biography. Includes description of events.

Stugna River 1093
Conflicts in 1093
1093 in Europe
Stugna
11th century in Kievan Rus'